The 2012 Delaware State Hornets baseball team  represented Delaware State University in the sport of baseball during the 2012 college baseball season.  The Hornets competed in Division I of the National Collegiate Athletic Association (NCAA) and the Northern Division of the Mid-Eastern Athletic Conference (MEAC).  They played their home games on the university's Dover, Delaware campus.  The team was coached by J. P. Blandin, who was in his twelfth season at Delaware State. The Hornets were looking to build upon their 26-29 record from the 2011 season.

The Hornets finished the regular season at 35-15 with a conference record of 22-2. The Hornets would lose in the second round to Maryland Eastern Shore, but they would then go onto the finals of the MEAC Tournament to face Bethune–Cookman. The Hornets beat the Wildcats in the first game 3-2, but were stopped 8-3 in the second game, thus ending their season.

Roster

Schedule

! style="background:#75B2DD;color:white;"| Regular Season
|- valign="top" 

|- bgcolor="#ddffdd"
| May 17 || vs. (4S)  || (1) || Marty L. Miller Field || 10-8 || Elliott (10-2) || McGowin (6-5) || None ||   || 36-15 || 1–0
|- align="center" bgcolor="ffddd"
| May 18) || vs. (3N)  || (1) || Marty L. Miller Field || 6-7 || Saca (4-2) || Gardner (2-6) || Parker (2) ||   || 36-16 || 1-1
|- align="center" bgcolor= "ddffdd"
| May 18 || vs. (2N)  || (1) || Marty L. Miller Field || 16-2 || Adkins (8-1) || Fulmer (4-4) || none ||   || 37-16 || 2-1
|- align="center" bgcolor= "ddffdd"
| May 19 || vs. (3S)  || (1) || Marty L. Miller Field || 4-2 || Haas (4-1) || Torrellas (1-6) || Marshalsea (1) ||   || 38-16 || 3-1
|- align="center" bgcolor= "ddffdd"
| May 19 || vs. (3N) UMES || (1) || Marty L. Miller Field || 7-2 || Brown (2-1) || Smith (0-6) || none ||   || 39-16 || 4-1
|- align="center" bgcolor= "ddffdd"
| May 20 || vs, (1S) Bethune–Cookman || (1) || Marty L. Miller Field || 3-2 || Dill (3-1) || Hernandez (6-3) || Elliott (1) ||   || 40-16 || 5-1
|- align="center" bgcolor= "ffddd" 
| May 20 || vs. (1S) Bethune–Cookman || (1) || Marty L. Miller Field || 3-8 || Rivera (3-3) || McClain (9-4) || none ||   || 40-17 || 5-2 
|-

References

Delaware State
Delaware State Hornets baseball seasons
Delaware State Hornets